The Roselawn Memorial Park Gatehouse is a historic cemetery office building in Roselawn Memorial Park, a large public cemetery at 2801 Asher Avenue in Little Rock, Arkansas.  It stands just inside and to the left of the main gate.  It is a single story building, with a gable-on-hip roof, stuccoed walls, and a foundation whose exterior is finished in rough cobblestone.  At either end of its main facade are two arches, lined with red brick, providing access to the recessed building entrances.  Similar arches on the side walls give the recess a porch-like feel.  The building was designed by Thompson and Harding, and built in 1924.  It is the only known gatehouse design of firms associated with Arkansas architect Charles L. Thompson.

The building was listed on the National Register of Historic Places in 1982.

See also
National Register of Historic Places listings in Little Rock, Arkansas

References

Park buildings and structures on the National Register of Historic Places in Arkansas
Colonial Revival architecture in Arkansas
Mission Revival architecture in Arkansas
Buildings and structures completed in 1924
Buildings and structures in Little Rock, Arkansas